The Garage is a 1920 American two-reel silent comedy film directed by and starring Roscoe "Fatty" Arbuckle and featuring Buster Keaton. This was the fourteenth and last film starring the duo before Keaton set up his own studio and Arbuckle started making feature-length films. The film also stars Luke the Dog, who starred in many other short comedies with Arbuckle. The film was also known as Fire Chief.

Plot
Fatty and Buster play automobile mechanics and firemen at a garage in a fire station. Molly Malone plays the boss' daughter who is constantly pestered by a stranger named Jim (McCoy) who wishes to make her his girlfriend, though she turns him down after the flowers he brings her end up accidentally soaked in motor oil thanks to Fatty and Buster. Livid, Jim raises the alarm in the fire station to make Fatty and Buster think there is a fire and forcing them to rush across town. However, Jim accidentally starts a real fire while trying to exit the station and Fatty and Buster immediately return to put out the fire and rescue Molly who is trapped inside. They attach the fire hose to a hydrant, but the hose has a leak, forcing Fatty to sit on it. After a streetcar runs over the hose, Fatty, Buster and several of the townspeople rescue Molly using a life net but she bounces up into the telephone wires. Fatty and Buster eventually get Molly down but become trapped themselves; luckily Molly moves a car beneath them just before they fall and all three ride off together.

Cast

 Roscoe "Fatty" Arbuckle as Mechanic / Fireman
 Buster Keaton as Mechanic / Fireman
 Molly Malone as Garage Owner's Daughter
 Harry McCoy as Jim
 Dan Crimmins as Rube the Garage Owner (as Daniel Crimmins)
 Luke the Dog 
 Alice Lake in undetermined role (uncredited) (unconfirmed)

Product placement
A favorable review of this movie by the weekly trade publication Harrison's Reports was followed by the statement:

Brand name product placement in movies may have occurred before the 1920s, but this is the earliest movie cited by Harrison's Reports for that practice. For the next four decades, Harrison's Reports frequently denounced product placement.

See also
 List of American films of 1920
 Roscoe Arbuckle filmography
 Buster Keaton filmography
 List of firefighting films

References

External links

 

 The Garage at the International Buster Keaton Society

1920 films
1920 comedy films
Silent American comedy films
American silent short films
American black-and-white films
Films about firefighting
Films directed by Roscoe Arbuckle
1920 short films
Articles containing video clips
Paramount Pictures films
American comedy short films
1920s American films